Blazer's Scouts was a Scout Dragoon unit of the Union Army during the second half of the American Civil War. They were particularly active in tracking down and confronting Confederate States Army partisans and guerrillas in West Virginia and Virginia; especially those of Colonel John S. Mosby. They specialized in anti-guerrilla warfare, dragoon style sudden attacks, reconnaissance and scouting for gathering intelligence in enemy areas, and tracking targets hunt.

History
Colonel Carr B. White organized the original cavalry company (initially known as the Brigade Scouts or Spencer's Scouts) at Fayetteville, West Virginia, in mid-September 1863. They were first commanded by Captain John W. Spencer of the 9th West Virginia Infantry, but he soon was replaced by two lieutenants from Ohio regiments, the 12th and 91st. Men from these three regiments constituted the unit. After engaging in several operations to negate the Confederate partisans, the scouts were disbanded only two months after being formed, although they did take the field briefly in December.

Brigadier General George Crook, the commander of the Army of West Virginia (also known as the VIII Corps) reformed the unit in the spring of 1864 under Lieutenant Richard R. Blazer, and the company became popularly known as Blazer's Scouts. Their mission was to protect Union supply lines and also combat Confederate guerrilla parties. They were hand-picked men selected from the 5th, 9th, 13th and 14th West Virginia infantry regiments, 2nd West Virginia Cavalry and the 12th, 23rd, 34th, 36th Ohio, and 91st volunteer infantry regiments. They played important roles in the "Dublin Raid" on the Virginia and Tennessee Railroad and in Major General David Hunter's Lynchburg Raid.

Reassigned with the VIII Corps to the Army of the Shenandoah under Philip H. Sheridan, Blazer's Scouts began dueling with Mosby's Rangers in a series of operations in the Shenandoah Valley during the Valley Campaigns of 1864. They used the superior firepower of their Spencer repeating rifles effectively, and initially thwarted Confederate efforts in the region. However, on November 18, 1864, at Kabletown, West Virginia, Mosby was able to defeat Blazer's Scouts, inflicting 42 casualties, almost half of the Union force. Blazer himself was captured and remained a POW for the rest of the war.

The remaining members would continue doing scout duties, until January 1865 when Blazer's Scouts were officially disbanded.

See also
List of Ohio Civil War units
List of West Virginia Civil War Union units

References
 Ohio in the Civil War: Blazer's Scouts
 West Virginia in the Civil War: Blazer's Scouts

Notes

Units and formations of the Union Army from Ohio
Units and formations of the Union Army from West Virginia
Irregular forces of the American Civil War
1863 establishments in West Virginia
Military units and formations established in 1863
Military units and formations disestablished in 1865